Khachna is a mountain range in Algeria.

It may also refer to: 
 Khemis El-Khachna, a town and commune in Algeria.
 Khemis El Khachna District, a district in Algeria.
 IB Khemis El Khachna, a football club in Algeria.